Alastair Colin Leckie Campbell, 4th Baron Colgrain, DL (born 16 September 1951) is a British hereditary peer and Conservative member of the House of Lords.

He was educated at Eton College and Trinity College, Cambridge (BA 1973). He was High Sheriff of Kent from 2013 to 2014 and was appointed a Deputy Lieutenant of Kent in 2017. His wife, Lady Colgrain, became Lord Lieutenant of Kent in 2020.

He was elected to sit in the House at a whole House by-election in March 2017, in place of Lord Lyell who died January 2017.

References

1951 births
Living people
People educated at Eton College
Alumni of Trinity College, Cambridge
Barons in the Peerage of the United Kingdom
Conservative Party (UK) hereditary peers
Deputy Lieutenants of Kent
Place of birth missing (living people)
High Sheriffs of Kent
Hereditary peers elected under the House of Lords Act 1999